Baimaclia is a commune in Cantemir District, Moldova. It is composed of three villages: Acui, Baimaclia, and Suhat.

During the interwar period, the commune was the seat of Plasa Ștefan cel Mare, in Cahul County, Romania.

References

Communes of Cantemir District
Cahul County (Romania)